The Amselflue is a mountain of the Plessur Alps, overlooking Arosa in the canton of Graubünden. The main summit has an elevation of 2,781 metres, while the eastern summit, located directly above the Maienfelder Furgga, is 2,768 metre high.

References

External links
 Amselflue on Hikr

Mountains of the Alps
Mountains of Switzerland
Mountains of Graubünden
Two-thousanders of Switzerland